Heth is a surname. Notable people with the surname include:

 Henry Heth (1825–1899), career United States Army officer who became a Confederate general in the American Civil War
 Henry Heth, a prominent Virginia businessman
 Joice Heth (c. 1756 – 1836), African-American slave exhibited by P. T. Barnum with the false claim that she was the 161-year-old nursing "mammy" of George Washington
 William A. Heth